Jean-Pierre Kuhn (7 May 1903 – 2 August 1984) was a Luxembourgian cyclist. He competed in two events at the 1924 Summer Olympics.

References

External links
 

1903 births
1984 deaths
Luxembourgian male cyclists
Olympic cyclists of Luxembourg
Cyclists at the 1924 Summer Olympics
Place of birth missing